The 2013–14 Nemzeti Bajnokság I is the 63rd season of the Nemzeti Bajnokság I, Hungary's premier Handball league.

Team information 

The following 12 clubs compete in the NB I during the 2013–14 season:

Personnel and kits
Following is the list of clubs competing in 2013–14 Nemzeti Bajnokság I, with their manager, captain, kit manufacturer and shirt sponsor.

Regular season

Standings

Pld - Played; W - Won; L - Lost; PF - Points for; PA - Points against; Diff - Difference; Pts - Points.

Schedule and results
In the table below the home teams are listed on the left and the away teams along the top.

Top goalscorers

Source:

Championship Playoffs 
Teams in bold won the playoff series. Numbers to the left of each team indicate the team's original playoff seeding. Numbers to the right indicate the score of each playoff game.

Semifinals

1st leg

2nd leg

Győri Audi ETO KC won series 2–0 and advanced to Final.

FTC-Rail Cargo Hungária won series 2–0 and advanced to Final.

Final

1st leg

2nd leg

Győri Audi ETO KC won Championship final series 2–0.

Team roster
1 Katrine Lunde Haraldsen, 5 Heidi Løke, 8 Dóra Hornyák, 11 Dorina Korsós, 12 Orsolya Herr, 13 Anita Görbicz, 14 Anikó Kovacsics, 18 Eduarda Amorim, 19 Viktória Rédei Soós, 20 Raphaëlle Tervel, 22 Adrienn Orbán, 24 Ivett Szepesi, 25 Szederke Sirián, 31 Ágnes Hornyák, 32 Katarina Bulatović and 33 Bernadett Bódi

Head coach: Ambros Martín

Third Place

Érd won series 2–0 and won the Third Place.

Fifth place Playoff

Final standings

Pld - Played; W - Won; L - Lost; PF - Points for; PA - Points against; Diff - Difference; Pts - Points.

Results
In the table below the home teams are listed on the left and the away teams along the top.

Relegation Round

Final standings

Pld - Played; W - Won; L - Lost; PF - Points for; PA - Points against; Diff - Difference; Pts - Points.

Results
In the table below the home teams are listed on the left and the away teams along the top.

Final standing

(C) = Champion; (R) = Relegated; (P) = Promoted; (E) = Eliminated; (O) = Play-off winner; (A) = Advances to a further round.

References

External links
 Hungarian Handball Federaration 

Nemzeti Bajnokság I (women's handball)
2013–14 domestic handball leagues
Nemzeti Bajnoksag I Women
2013 in women's handball
2014 in women's handball